Jared Wolfe (born April 7, 1988) is an American professional golfer. 

Wolfe played on the Web.com Tour in 2014, the PGA Tour Canada in 2015 and the PGA Tour Latinoamérica in 2017. He won the inaugural BMW Jamaica Classic on the PGA Tour Latinoamérica, played in June 2017. He finished second in the PGA Tour Latinoamérica Order of Merit in 2017 to earn a Web.com Tour card for 2018.

Professional wins (5)

Korn Ferry Tour wins (2)

PGA Tour Latinoamérica wins (3)

Team appearances
Professional
Aruba Cup (representing PGA Tour Latinoamérica): 2017

See also
2021 Korn Ferry Tour Finals graduates

References

External links
 
 

American male golfers
PGA Tour Latinoamérica golfers
PGA Tour golfers
Murray State Racers men's golfers
Golfers from Kentucky
Golfers from Florida
Sportspeople from Louisville, Kentucky
People from Ponte Vedra Beach, Florida
1988 births
Living people